The 2020–21 CSA T20 Challenge was the seventeenth season of the CSA T20 Challenge, established by Cricket South Africa. The tournament was played during February 2021, with all the matches taking place at the Kingsmead Cricket Ground in Durban. It replaced the 2020 edition of the Mzansi Super League, which was cancelled due to the COVID-19 pandemic. On 5 February 2021, Cricket South Africa confirmed the fixtures for the tournament. Lions were the defending champions.

Following the conclusion of the group stage, Lions and Warriors advanced to the play-off final, with Dolphins finishing top of the group and progressing directly to the tournament's final. In the play-off match, Lions beat Warriors by seven wickets. In the final, Lions retained their title, beating Dolphins by four wickets.

Squads
On 15 February 2021, Cricket South Africa confirmed all the squads for the tournament.

Points table

 Advanced to the Final
 Advanced to the Play-off Final

Fixtures

Round-robin

Finals

References

External links
 Series home at ESPN Cricinfo

South African domestic cricket competitions
CSA T20 Challenge
2020–21 South African cricket season